Antonio Merayo (19 August 1909 – 27 April 1999) was an Argentine cinematographer.

Selected filmography
 Autumn Roses (1931)
 Palermo (1937)
 Cadetes de San Martín (1937)
 The Good Doctor (1939)
 Girls Orchestra (1941)
 Malambo (1942)
 Candida, Woman of the Year (1943)
 Dark Valley (1943)
 24 Hours in the Life of a Woman (1944)
 Saint Candida (1945)
 The Songstress (1946)
 Cristina (1946)
 The Three Musketeers (1946)
 Passport to Rio (1948)
 The Tango Returns to Paris (1948)
 The Bohemian Soul (1949)
 The Unwanted (1951)
 Alejandra (1956)
 Behind a Long Wall (1958)
 The Last Floor (1962)
 Would You Marry Me? (1967)
 La Cama (1968)
 Había una vez un circo (1972)

References

Bibliography 
 Peter Cowie & Derek Elley. World Filmography: 1967. Fairleigh Dickinson University Press, 1977.

External links 
 

1909 births
1999 deaths
Argentine cinematographers